The Journal of Vascular and Interventional Radiology is a monthly peer-reviewed medical journal covering the field of interventional radiology. It was established in 1990 and is published by Elsevier on behalf of the Society of Interventional Radiology. The editor-in-chief is Daniel Y. Sze. The journal is abstracted and indexed in the Science Citation Index Expanded, Biotechnology Research Abstracts, CINAHL, Embase, MEDLINE, and Scopus. According to the Journal Citation Reports, the journal has a 2021 impact factor of 3.682.

References

External links

English-language journals
Elsevier academic journals
Interventional radiology
Radiology and medical imaging journals
Publications established in 1990
Monthly journals